Ice stupa is a form of glacier grafting technique that creates artificial glaciers, used for storing winter water (which otherwise would go unused) in the form of conical shaped ice heaps. During summer, when water is scarce, the Ice stupa melts to increase water supply for crops. Ice stupa was invented by Sonam Wangchuk in Ladakh, India and the project is undertaken by the NGO Students' Educational and Cultural Movement of Ladakh. Launched in October 2013, the test project started in January 2014 under the project name The Ice Stupa project. On 15 November 2016, Sonam Wangchuk was awarded the Rolex Awards for Enterprise for his work on Ice stupa.

Ladakh is a cold desert also during winter, agriculture is not practiced due to frozen soil and low air temperatures. During spring season, water requirement for sowing increases whereas streams dry up. Due to climate change, the region experiences hotter summers with increase in melts along with shift in the timing and precipitation of the melts. Subsequently, during the spring season water is more scarce which in turn impacts agriculture and food supplies.

In the month of May, Sonam Wangchuk noticed the ice under  a bridge. Despite summer and lowest elevation in Ladakh, the ice had not melted since it was not under direct sunlight. Wangchuk realized ice could last longer in Ladakh if it could be shaded from the sun. Since providing shade to larger water bodies was not possible, Wangchuk thought of freezing and storing water in the shape of a cone that offers minimum surface area to the sun whilst holding high volume of water.

In October 2013, Sonam Wangchuk created the first prototype of  Ice Stupa by freezing  in Leh without any shade from the sun. Water was piped from upstream using gravity. Electricity or machinery was not used for pumping water. The Ice Stupa did not melt fully till 18 May 2014, even when the temperature was above .

Ladakh region experiences water shortage for the needs of agriculture during spring season which restricts cultivating period further in a subarctic climate area. By harnessing a fraction of the abundant wind, hydro and solar power potential of the Ladakh region without the need of energy storage, ice stupas can be made using snow cannons to irrigate all the cultivable land with crops, arcades, plantations, etc.

With the aim to promote artificial glaciers and save water for irrigation, Ice Stupa Competition is being held since 2019.  In 2019, 12 Ice Stupas were built. In 2020 around 25 stupas are being built.

References

External links
 Video about Ice stupa
 Adaptation: Ice stupas of Ladakh PBS series hosted by climate researcher Alizé Carrère

Water conservation
Glaciers
Irrigation
Science and technology in Ladakh